The Military Writers Society of America, also known as the MWSA, is non-profit, 501(c)3 association of authors, poets, and artists, many of whom are U.S. military veterans or family members of veterans.  Membership is open to anyone with an interest in, affinity for, or connection to the military.

The organization provides a venue for meeting other authors and artists, sharing ideas and learning about writing and the publishing industry.  Its goals are: 
(a) to improve writing skills of its members, and
(b) to reach out to schools, military organizations and veterans’ groups to foster and encourage an interest in writing, and
(c) to recognize the accomplishments of its members' work in literature and the communication arts.

The organization also reviews and considers for award books and other forms of art and literature each year.  Annual award winners are announced during an awards banquet, which is normally held during the organization's annual general membership conference.

The experience level and relative success of the membership varies widely, from relatively obscure, first-time writers to best-selling authors like Joe Buff, Gayle Lynds, Dale Dye, and Joseph Badal.

History
The Military Writers Society of America was the brainchild of its founder and first president,  W. H. (Rev. Bill) McDonald Jr.  A crew chief/door-gunner on UH-1D Huey helicopters in 1966 and 1967, Bill flew with the 128th Helicopter Assault Company  out of Phu Loi, South Vietnam. He was awarded numerous medals, including: the Distinguished Flying Cross, the Bronze Star, fourteen Air Medals and the Purple Heart.

Like most who encounter the moral extremes of combat, Bill discovered that war is a crucible of spiritual transformation.  It is, quite simply, impossible to live through that sort of experience and not be changed by it.  To better understand his own experiences, Bill began to write about them. In the years since, he has discovered literally hundreds of other warriors who are driven to explore and reveal their experiences through fiction, non-fiction, poetry and art.   It was Bill's vision to bring them together to share and promote their respective arts. With more than 1200 members, the Military Writers Society of America is that vision brought to life.

The MWSA started off as branch of The American Authors Association (AAA) before becoming a fully separated organization of its own.  There are annual awards given for books, music Cds and short films.

The current President of MWSA is Bob Doerr, an Eric Hoffer Award winner, and a former Author of the Year for MWSA.

The past president is NY Times Best Selling Author Dwight Zimmerman.

The previous president was Joyce Faulkner. She is a ghostwriter, an editor and a web, newspaper & book designer. She has been a member of MWSA since 2006. Her goal is to help veterans record their piece of history—for themselves, their families, their communities—and our country, to make sure that all of our history is recorded and recognized. Her interest in military writing stems from her book In the Shadow of Suribachi, the story of her father's experiences as a young Marine at the Battle of Iwo Jima.

The second president of the MWSA after the Founder McDonald stepped down for health reasons was Tony Lazzarini - a Vietnam combat veteran. After returning to the states, Tony worked for IBM as a service technician on communicating systems with their advanced products group. He left after 10 years to open his own high performance automotive shop. Along with racing and building cars, his other passions include writing and motorcycles. Tony started Voyager Publishing and his writing accomplishments include two award-winning books, a prize-winning musical stage play and two short films.

2018 Award Winners
During an awards banquet, held in the beautiful Hilton Garden Inn Mount Pleasant, South Carolina, the Military Writers Society of America (MWSA) announced its 2018 Medal Winners.  The award recipients are listed below by Genre-Subcategory, medal won, and alphabetically by book title.

Children & Young Adult—Picture Book

Silver Medals
         Eddie and Bingo: Destination Christmas by Kathleen and Katherine Taylor
         My Dad Got Hurt. What Can I Do? by Brunella Costagliola
         my daddy is a sailor by Tahna Desmond Fox
         My Daddy Sleeps Everywhere by Jesse Franklin

Children's Chapter Book

Gold Medal
         Jacqueline by Jackie Minniti

Collections—Anthology

Silver Medal
         Love, Sweet to Spicy by the Corrales Writing Group

Collections—Religious/Spiritual

Silver Medal
         Holy in the Moment by Ginger Harrington

Historical Fiction

Bronze Medal
         Uncommon Bond by John House

History

Gold Medals
         The Shadow Tiger by William C McDonald III & Barbara L. Evenson
         Tiger Bravo's War by Rick St John

Silver Medals
         Air Force One by Nicholas Veronico
         Blades of Thunder by W. Larry Dandridge
         Chopper Heroes by William Peterson
         The Solomons Campaigns by William L. McGee

Bronze Medal
         Wonderful Flying Machines by Barrett Beard

Horror/Fantasy/Sci Fi

Silver Medal
         Tested by Connie Cockrell

How to/Business/Self Help

Silver Medal
         Hal Moore on Leadership by Harold G. Moore

Literary Fiction

Gold Medal
         Syllables of Rain by D.S. Lliteras

Silver Medal
         The Perfection of Valor by Bob Mustin

Bronze Medal
         Flowers from Afghanistan by Suzy Parish

Memoir/Biography

Gold Medals
         Marcel's Letters by Carolyn Porter
         Racing Back to Vietnam by John Pendergrass

Silver Medal
         Heroes to the End by Jim Smith
   
Bronze Medals
         Kanaga Diary by Estelle Lauer
         Through Smoke-Teared Eyes by Johnny F. Pugh

Mystery/Thriller

Gold Medals
         Land of Wolves by Tj Turner
         Soft Target by John D Trudel
         The Consultant by Tj O'Connor

Silver Medals
         Homeland Burning by Brinn Colenda
         Into a Dark Frontier by John Mangan
         Sins of the Fathers by Joseph Badal

Pictorial/Coffee Table

Gold Medal
         Lighthouses of America by Tom Beard

Poetry—Poetry Book

Gold Medal
         War in the Company of Medics by John J. Candelaria

Bronze Medal
         Vietnam Voices by Michael Lepore

Reference

Silver Medal
         The Wicked Problem of Cultural Heritage and Conflict by Christopher Herndon and Joris Kila

Bronze Medals
         African American Warrant Officers by Farrell Chiles
         Bradley vs. BMP by Mike Guardia

Young Adult (Fiction of Non-Fiction)

Silver Medal
         Sebastian's Tale by Dylan Weisse

References

External links
 Website

American writers' organizations
American veterans' organizations
Academic works about the military